Georg Valentin von Munthe af Morgenstierne (2 January 1892 – 3 March 1978) was a Norwegian professor of linguistics with the University of Oslo (UiO). He specialized in Indo-Iranian languages.

Studies 
During the years 1923 to 1971, Morgenstierne carried out fieldwork in Afghanistan, Pakistan, India and Iran. In 1924, he undertook the first of his two major linguistic expeditions. He arrived in Kabul with a personal letter of introduction to the King of Afghanistan, from the King of Norway. Together with  studying the languages, Morgenstierne collected remarkable scientific materials from the culture of the regional people, like images, movies from pre-Islamic ceremonial dances and sound recordings from nearly extinct languages. The materials are available in his database at the National Library of Norway.

Writings 
 His publications  listed in BIBSYS
 Report on a Linguistic Mission to Afghanistan. Instituttet for Sammenlignende Kulturforskning, Serie C I-2. Oslo. 
 Report on a Linguistic Mission to North-Western India by Georg Morgenstierne

Further reading 
 Nils Johan Ringdal: Georg Valentin von Munthe af Morgenstiernes forunderlige liv og reiser Aschehoug 2008  
 Ulf Andenæs: En norsk legende i Orienten. Bokanmeldelse i Aftenposten Kultur 22 May 2008 side 10

References

External links 

 National Library of Norway
 Search the general Morgenstierne database in the National Library of Norway site

Linguists from Norway
1892 births
1978 deaths
Academic staff of the University of Oslo
Indo-Europeanists
Linguists of Indo-European languages
Indologists
Iranologists
Linguists of Iranian languages
Linguists of Indo-Aryan languages
20th-century linguists
Corresponding Fellows of the British Academy